John Charles Traupman (January 2, 1923 – February 18, 2019) was an American Professor Emeritus at the Saint Joseph's University, of classics.

Opera
His works on colloquial Latin include the following:
1966, The New Collegiate Latin & English Dictionary
1988, Latin is Fun, Book I
1994, Latin is Fun, Book II
1994, Latin Dictionary (editio secunda lexici Collegiati)
1996, Conversational Latin for Oral Proficiency
2007, Latin and English Dictionary (editio tertia)

Notae

1923 births
2019 deaths
Saint Joseph's University faculty
20th-century Latin-language writers
American writers in Latin